Alexandre-Hyacinthe Dunouy (1757 – 11 November 1841) was a French painter known for his landscapes.

A native of Paris, Dunouy began his career depicting views of the city and the surrounding region, exhibiting at the Paris Salon for the first time in 1791.  exhibited views of the area around Rome and Naples; he showed regularly until 1833, save for a few absences.  He received medals in 1819 and 1827.  He is known to have traveled to Italy in 1810 under the patronage of Joachim Murat; there is also evidence that he traveled there in the 1780s.  He is also associated with the Auvergne, Savoy, and the area around Lyon.

Dunouy's paintings were primarily small and decorative, and he was associated with the artists known as little masters.  Their compositions are generally classical, and feature great detail and even lighting.  Some of his works include figures added by Jean-Louis Demarne and Nicolas Antoine Taunay.

Dunouy may have taught Achille-Etna Michallon; he died in 1841 in Jouy-en-Josas.

References

Philip Conisbee, Sarah Faunce, and Jeremy Strick. In the Light of Italy: Corot and Early Open-Air Painting.  New Haven; Yale University Press, 1996.
Artnet profile
Scholarly articles in English Scholarly articles] about Alexandre-Hyacinthe Dunouy both in web and PDF @ the Spanish Old Masters Gallery

1757 births
1841 deaths
18th-century French painters
French male painters
19th-century French painters
French landscape painters
Painters from Paris
19th-century French male artists
18th-century French male artists